The .300 Remington Ultra Magnum, also known as the .300 Ultra Mag, 7.62×72mm or .300 RUM is a 7.62 mm (.308 inch) rifle cartridge introduced by Remington Arms in 1999. The .300 Remington Ultra Magnum is one of the largest commercially available .30 caliber magnums currently being produced. It is a beltless, rebated rim cartridge, capable of handling all large North American game, as well as long-range shooting. Among commercially produced .30-caliber rifle chamberings, the .300 Remington Ultra Magnum is second only to the .30-378 Weatherby Magnum in cartridge-case capacity.

Origin & History
In the early 1980s Aubrey White and Noburo Uno of North American Shooting Systems (NASS) based in British Columbia Canada began experimenting with the full length .404 Jeffery by reducing the taper and necking it down to various calibers such as 7 mm, .308, 311, 338, 9.3 mm and .375. These cartridges were known variously as the Canadian Magnum or the Imperial Magnums. Rifles were built on Remington Model 700 Long Actions and used McMillan stocks. Cartridges were fire formed from .404 Jeffery cases  with the rim turned down, taper reduced and featured sharp shoulders.

Both Remington and Dakota Arms purchased the brass designed by Noburo Uno for use in their own experimentation and cartridge development. In 1999 Remington released the first of a series of cartridges virtually identical to the Canadian Magnum cartridges which featured a slightly wider body, increased taper, and shallower shoulders and named it the .300 Remington Ultra Magnum. Dakota too released their own version of the cartridge but chose not to turn down the rim and shortened the case to work in a standard length action. Remington would go on to design their own shortened versions of the Ultra Magnum cartridge which they were to call the Remington Short Action Ultra Magnum or RSAUM for short.

Design & Specification
The .300 Remington Ultra Magnum is a member of the Remington Ultra Magnum cartridge family based on the .404 Jeffery via the Canadian Magnum cartridges. As these cartridges feature wider bodies than the belted magnums based on the .375 H&H case, these cartridges have greater case capacities than their corresponding full length belted Magnum cartridges such as the 7 mm Shooting Times Westerner, the .300 Weatherby Magnum, .340 Weatherby Magnum and the .375 Ackley Improved.

The .300 RUM features a rebated rim much like the .300 Canadian Magnum so as to allow the cartridge to function in the Remington M700 action without having to increase the bolt and bolt face diameter of the action. Unlike the belted Magnum cases based on the .375 H&H Magnum cartridge, the .300 RUM does not have a belt. All things being equal, a beltless cartridge would feed more reliably and more smoothly than a belted cartridge. Furthermore, as this is a beltless cartridge headspacing is designed to take place on the shoulder, which is considered beneficial by some as it is thought to promote accuracy and prolong case life of the cartridge. As modern belted magnums such as 7mm Remington Magnum and .300 Winchester Magnum actually headspace on the shoulder despite retaining the belt found on their parent cartridge, belted or unbelted is basically irrelevant in discussions of modern cartridges, and particularly so in discussions of unbelted cartridges.

SAAMI compliant .300 Remington Ultra Magnum cartridge schematic: All dimensions in inches [millimeters].

Maximum case overflow capacity is 122.5 gr. of water (7.30 cm3).

Performance

Remington ammunition for the .300 RUM is available in three Power Levels. Power Level I duplicates the .30-06 Springfield, Power Level II that of the .300 Winchester Magnum and Power Level III is the full power load. These are among the highest velocities attained by a .30 caliber production rifle cartridge.

The .300 RUM is an excellent long range cartridge with the ability to deliver a useful level of energy downrange especially with the power level III ammunition. Due to its high velocity it exhibits less bullet drop than most other .30 caliber (7.62 mm) cartridges.

Compared to other production .30 caliber (7.62 mm) cartridges, only the .30-378 Weatherby Magnum surpasses the .300 Remington Ultra Magnum. Factory loaded .30-378 Weatherby Magnum ammunition has a  velocity advantage over the .300 RUM cartridge with any given bullet weight. However, the .30-378 Weatherby Magnum is considered the most overbore production sporting cartridge available and is not considered as efficient as the .300 RUM cartridge.  In part due to its excessive freebore lengths the claimed velocities by Weatherby is a resultant factor of this freebore length.  If chambered to allow bullets to seat to the lands of the rifling the large Weatherby cartridges would exhibit overpressure signs immediately.  All things equal the .300 RUM and .30-378 Weatherby if chambered with the same throat and freebore would be comparable.  Known freebore lengths of older Weatherby rifles have been in excess of 1 inch.  The .30-378 is one of the most extreme cases of overbore and has among the highest throat erosion levels of any rifles.

Sporting Usage
The .300 Remington Ultra Magnum cartridge was conceived as a long range hunting cartridge and in this it exceeds most other cartridges. It is able to launch heavy bullets with high sectional densities at high velocities there by retaining energy to take game cleanly at longer ranges than less powerful cartridges such as the .30-06 Springfield and even the .300 Winchester Magnum.

See also
 List of rifle cartridges
 Table of handgun and rifle cartridges
 7 mm caliber

References

Remington Ultra Magnum rifle cartridges
Pistol and rifle cartridges